Segundo is an unincorporated community and a census-designated place (CDP) located in and governed by Las Animas County, Colorado, United States. The population of the Segundo CDP was 98 at the United States Census 2010. The Trinidad post office (Zip Code 81082) serves the area.

History
Segundo was founded by Colorado Fuel and Iron (CF&I) as a company town to house its workers for a local coal mine. The town was the second mining community developed by CF&I in 1904 behind Primero and was referenced in the town's name, with segundo meaning "second" in Spanish. CF&I offered adequate housing for the time, and promoted upward mobility through its sponsorship of a YMCA center, an elementary school, small businesses, and a company store. Segundo was a prosperous town until the 1920s, when the population began to decline due to constant health issues related to air pollution and outdated housing that lacked indoor plumbing. Declines in demand for metallurgical coke led to workers being laid off and, following a major fire in 1929, CF&I ceased their operations in Segundo. The town's population plummeted to the point that it almost became a ghost town.

Geography

Demographics

See also

Outline of Colorado
Index of Colorado-related articles
State of Colorado
Colorado cities and towns
Colorado census designated places
Colorado counties
Las Animas County, Colorado

References

External links

Segundo @ UncoverColorado.com
Segundo @ Sangres.com
Segundo @ SouthernColorado.info
Las Animas County website

Census-designated places in Las Animas County, Colorado
Census-designated places in Colorado
1904 establishments in Colorado